In rhythmic gymnastics, a 
gymnastics ribbon is an apparatus composed of a handle (called "stick"), a ribbon, and attachment, that is used during a floor performance.

Handle
The handle can be of any colour and is usually made of wood, bamboo, or plastic. It has a maximum diameter of 1 cm (2/5") at its widest, a cylindrical or conical shape slip tape or may have a rubber handle for a maximum length of 10 cm (4") at the level of the grip. The top of
a supple strap (of string or nylon) held in place by a nylon thread wound round the stick for a
a metal ring fixed directly onto the stick.
a metal ring (vertical, horizontal or oblique) fixed to the stick by two metal pins held in place by nylon or metallic thread round wound around the stick for the maximum 5 cm (2").
a metal ring (fixed, mobile or pivoting) or a supple strap, fixed to a metal tip of no more than 3 cm (1.2").

Ribbon
The ribbon is made of satin or another similar cloth, and can be of any colour. It may be multi-coloured and have designs on it. The ribbon itself must be at least 35g (1 oz), 4–6 cm (1.6–2.4") in width and for senior category a minimum length of 6m (20') (5m (16.25') for juniors).

The ribbon must be in one piece. The end that is attached to the stick is doubled for a maximum length of 1m (3'). This is stitched down both sides. At the top, a very thin reinforcement or rows of machine stitching for a maximum length of 5 cm is authorized. This extremity may end in a strap, or have an eyelet (a small hole, edged with buttonhole stitch or a metal circle), to permit attaching the ribbon.

Attachment
The ribbon is fixed to the stick by means of a supple attachment such as thread, nylon cord, or a series of articulated rings. The attachment has a maximum length of 7 cm (2.8"), not counting the strap or metal ring at the end of the stick where it will be fastened.

Elements
Rhythmic gymnastics routines require the ribbon to constantly be in motion. Compulsory elements for the ribbon include flicks, circles, snakes and spirals, and throws. It requires a high degree of coordination to form the spirals and circles as any knots which may accidentally form in the ribbon are penalised.  During a ribbon routine, large, smooth and flowing movements are looked for.

References

External links 

Asaf Messerer, soloist (1940): Ribbon Dance, Music by Reinhold Gliere (1875-1956),Elizabeth Paisieva, Choreography by Messerer and Lashchulin, Open Source Movies

Ribbon